National Taipei University of Education (NTUE) is a university located in Daan District, Taipei, Taiwan that predominantly focuses on teacher training. It was established in 1895, at the beginning of the Japanese colonial rule of Taiwan, as the Governor-General's Taihoku Teacher's College.

History
NTUE was originally established in 1896 as Zhishanyan School (芝山巖學堂) soon after Japan started to rule Taiwan. In December 1945, right after the handover of Taiwan from Japan to China, the school was renamed to Taiwan Provincial Normal School (臺灣省立臺北師範學校). After that, the school underwent several name changes: namely, Taiwan Provincial Junior Teachers’ College in 1961, Taiwan Provincial Taipei Normal College in 1987, National Taipei Teachers’ College in 1991, and finally National Taipei University of Education in 2005.

Academics
NTUE is organized into three colleges: Education, Humanities and Arts, and Science.

Ranking

Transportation
The university is accessible within walking distance South from Technology Building Station of the Taipei Metro.

Notable alumni
 Ho Kan, painter, father of contemporary Chinese art
 Chang Hung-lu, politician and member of Legislative Yuan
 Chuang Chi-fa, historian
 Huang Yu-cheng, Minister of the Hakka Affairs Council (2008-2014)

See also
 List of universities in Taiwan

References

External links

 
1895 establishments in Taiwan
Educational institutions established in 1895
Universities and colleges in Taiwan
Universities and colleges in Taipei
Technical universities and colleges in Taiwan
Teachers colleges